Ross Greenwell (born 19 September 1998) is an English cricketer. He made his first-class debut on 26 March 2019 for Durham against Durham MCCU.

References

External links
 

1998 births
Living people
English cricketers
Durham cricketers
Cricketers from Northumberland